Kenneth Alfred Brandon (8 February 1934 – May 1994) was a footballer who played as a winger in the Football League for Swindon Town, Chester and Darlington.

References

1934 births
1994 deaths
Footballers from Birmingham, West Midlands
Association football wingers
English footballers
Swindon Town F.C. players
Chester City F.C. players
Leicester City F.C. players
Darlington F.C. players
Hinckley Athletic F.C. players
English Football League players